The 21st International Stoke Mandeville Games, later known as the 1972 Summer Paralympics (also known as the XXI World Games for the Paralysed) was an international multi-sport event held in Heidelberg, West Germany, from August 2 to 11, 1972, in which athletes with physical disabilities competed against one another. The German Disabled Sports Association planned to stage the Games in Munich following the 1972 Olympic Games, however the Olympic village in Munich was designated to be closed and converted into private apartments. The organisers tried to arrange for alternative accommodation for the athletes but when this was not possible the city of Heidelberg stepped in with an invite to stage the Games at the University of Heidelberg's Institute for Physical Training.

In total 575 medals were awarded in 187 events in 10 different sports. Of the 42 competing National Paralympic Committees (NPCs) 31 won at least one medal. The host nation won the most gold medals, with 28, and the United States won the most total medals with 74. Rhodesia competed at these Games, winning 12 medals, but did not take part at the 1972 Summer Olympics after their invitation was withdrawn by the International Olympic Committee, four days before the opening ceremony, in response to African countries' protests against the Rhodesian regime. This medal table ranks the competing NPCs by the number of gold medals won by their athletes.

Notable gold medallists included Canadian Eugene Reimer, who set a world record in discus with a throw of 29.91 metres and also won a gold medal in the pentathlon and silver in the 4×60 metres wheelchair relay. A crowd of 4,000 watched the United States defeat defending champions Israel 59–58 to take the gold medal in men's wheelchair basketball. Zipora Rubin-Rosenbaum of Israel won a gold medal in the women's javelin throw 5 event, with a new world record of 18.50 metres, and also won a silver medal in the shot put.

Medal table

The ranking in this table is based on information provided by the International Paralympic Committee (IPC) and is consistent with IPC convention in its published medal tables. By default, the table is ordered by the number of gold medals the athletes from a nation have won (in this context, a "nation" is an entity represented by a NPC). The number of silver medals is taken into consideration next and then the number of bronze medals. If nations are still tied, equal ranking is given and they are listed alphabetically by IPC country code.

Two bronze medals were awarded in each table tennis and lawn bowls event. Some athletics and swimming events did not award silver or bronze medals.

See also
 1972 Summer Olympics medal table

References

Specific

1972
Paralympic
Medal Table